Cursive hieroglyphs, or hieroglyphic book hand, are a form of Egyptian hieroglyphs commonly used for handwritten religious documents, such as the Book of the Dead. This style of writing was typically written with ink and a reed brush on papyrus, wood, or leather. It was particularly common during the Ramesside Period, and many famous documents, such as the Papyrus of Ani, use it. It was also employed on wood for religious literature such as the Coffin Texts.

Cursive hieroglyphs should not be confused with the truly cursive form of hieroglyphs known as hieratic. Hieratic has many ligatures and signs unique to itself. However, there is a certain degree of influence from hieratic in the visual appearance of some signs. One significant difference is that the orientation of cursive hieroglyphs is not constant, reading right to left or left to right depending on the context, whereas hieratic is always read right to left. A right-to-left reading direction is also most common in the writing of cursive hieroglyphs, but they are usually arranged in columns rather than rows.

Notes

References
Cruz-Uribe, Eugene. 2001. "Scripts: An Overview." In The Oxford Encyclopedia of Ancient Egypt, edited by Donald B. Redford. Vol. 3. Oxford, New York, and Cairo: Oxford University Press and The American University in Cairo Press. 192–198 [194–195].

External links
 

Book of the Dead
Bronze Age writing systems
Egyptian languages
Egyptian hieroglyphs
Egyptian inventions